Walter Richard Calderón Carcelén, nicknamed Mamita (born October 17, 1977) is a retired Ecuadorian football player.

Club career
Calderón began his professional career at Quito-based club ESPOLI. In 2000, he made the move to Deportivo Cuenca. At the club, he became a regular starter. He was a key player in the club's 2004 national champion squad. He soon left the squad in 2006 and moved to El Nacional in 2007 and Deportivo Quito in 2008. With Deportivo Quito, he won his second national title. In 2009, he made the move to LDU Quito. Despite having irregular starting times, he became a clutch striker, providing goals at decisive times. He won another national title with Liga in 2010, the 2009 Copa Sudamericana, and two Recopa Sudamericana (2009, 2010).

Honors
Deportivo Cuenca
Serie A: 2004
Deportivo Quito
Serie A: 2008
LDU Quito
Serie A: 2010
Copa Sudamericana: 2009

References

External links
Calderón's FEF player card

1977 births
Living people
People from Ibarra Canton
Association football forwards
Ecuadorian footballers
Ecuador international footballers
C.D. ESPOLI footballers
C.D. Cuenca footballers
C.D. El Nacional footballers
S.D. Quito footballers
L.D.U. Quito footballers
L.D.U. Loja footballers
Imbabura S.C. footballers
Ecuadorian Serie A players